David Homel (born 1952) is an American-Canadian writer and literary translator. He is most noted as a two-time winner of the Governor General's Award for French to English translation, winning the award at the 1995 Governor General's Awards for Why Must a Black Writer Write About Sex?, his translation of Dany Laferrière's Cette grenade dans la main du jeune nègre est-elle une arme ou un fruit?, and alongside Fred A. Reed at the 2001 Governor General's Awards for Fairy Ring, their translation of Martine Desjardins' Le Cercle de Clara.

Originally from Chicago, Illinois, Homel moved to Canada in 1975, first taking a master's at the University of Toronto before settling in Montreal in 1980. He is married to children's writer Marie-Louise Gay, with whom he has cowritten several children's works.

His debut novel Electrical Storms, published in 1988, was shortlisted for the SmithBooks/Books in Canada First Novel Award in 1989. He is also a two-time winner of the Paragraphe Hugh MacLennan Prize for Fiction at the Quebec Writers' Federation Awards, winning in 2003 for The Speaking Cure and in 2019 for The Teardown.

He has been nominated for the Governor General's Award for translation on eight other occasions, for his translations of Laferrière's How to Make Love to a Negro Without Getting Tired (Comment faire l'amour avec un nègre sans se fatiguer) in 1988, An Aroma of Coffee (L'Odeur du café) in 1994 and A Drifting Year (Chronique de la dérive douce) in 1997, Yves Beauchemin's The Second Fiddle (Le Second violon) in 1998, Philippe Poloni's Olivo Oliva in 1999, Monique Proulx's The Heart Is an Involuntary Muscle (Le Cœur est un muscle involontaire) in 2003 and Wildlives (Champagne) in 2009, and Desjardins' All That Glitters (L'Élu du hasard) in 2005.

Works

Fiction
Electrical Storms - 1988
Rat Palms - 1992
Sonya & Jack - 1995
Get on Top - 1999
The Speaking Cure - 2003
Midway - 2010
The Fledglings - 2014
The Teardown - 2019
A House Without Spirits - 2022

Children's, with Marie-Louise Gay
Travels With My Family - 2006
On the Road Again! - 2008
Summer in the City - 2012
The Traveling Circus - 2015
Travels in Cuba - 2021

Non-fiction
Mapping Literature: The Art and Politics of Literary Translation - 1988
Le monde est un document, with photos by John Max - 2002
Lunging Into the Underbrush: A Life Lived Backwards - 2021

Translation
 Talking It Out: The October Crisis from Inside - 1987 (Francis Simard, Pour en finir avec Octobre)
 How to Make Love to a Negro - 1988 (Dany Laferrière, Comment faire l'amour avec un nègre sans se fatiguer)
 The Invisible Empire - 1990 (Denis Côté, L'invisible puissance)
 An Aroma of Coffee - 1993 (Dany Laferrière, L'odeur du café)
 Why Must a Black Writer Write About Sex - 1995 (Dany Laferrière, Cette grenade dans la main du jeune nègre est-elle une arme ou un fruit?)
 Sandman Blues - 1996 (Stéphane Bourguignon, L'avaleur de sable)
 A Drifting Year - 1997 (Dany Laferrière, Chronique de la dérive douce)
 The Second Fiddle - 1998 (Yves Beauchemin, Le second violon)
 Olivo Oliva - 1999 (Philippe Poloni)
 Fairy Rings - 2001 (Martine Desjardins, Le cercle de Clara), with Fred A. Reed
 The Heart Is an Involuntary Muscle - 2003 (Monique Proulx,Le cœur est un muscle involontaire), with Fred A. Reed
 All That Glitters - 2005 (Martine Desjardins, L'élu du hasard), with Fred A. Reed
 The Baldwins - 2006 (Serge Lamothe, Les Baldwin), with Fred A. Reed

References

1952 births
Living people
20th-century American novelists
20th-century American non-fiction writers
20th-century American male writers
21st-century American novelists
21st-century American non-fiction writers
21st-century American male writers
20th-century Canadian novelists
20th-century Canadian non-fiction writers
20th-century Canadian male writers
21st-century Canadian novelists
21st-century Canadian non-fiction writers
21st-century Canadian male writers
American male novelists
American male non-fiction writers
American memoirists
American translators
American emigrants to Canada
Canadian male novelists
Canadian non-fiction writers
Canadian translators
Canadian memoirists
Governor General's Award-winning translators
Writers from Chicago
Writers from Montreal
University of Toronto alumni